Charles Nicholas Aubé (6 May 1802 in Paris – 15 October 1869), was a French physician and entomologist.

Aubé studied at the school of pharmacy in Paris, joining in botanical sorties organised by its members and by the Museum.
Gaining his diploma  in  1824, he married a sister of  Gustave Planche (1808-1857) in 1826. Commencing studies in medicine in 1829 he gained the title of  Doctor in 1836 with a thesis on "la gale" (scabies). He was a founding member of the Société Entomologique de France of which he was "Dirigent" or director in 1842 and 1846. He worked on certain groups of Coleoptera for the publications of Pierre François Marie Auguste Dejean (1780–1845).

His collection is preserved by the Société Entomologique.

Works
Volume 6 of Spécies Général des Coléoptères, de la collection de M. le Comte Dejean (1838), titled Species général des hydrocanthares et gyriniens
Pselaphiorum monographia cum synonymia extricata Magasin de zoologie de Guérin 1833 (Paris)

References
Jean Gouillard (2004). Histoire des entomologistes français, 1750-1950. Édition entièrement revue et augmentée. Boubée (Paris) : 287 p.

External links
Internet Archive Pselaphiorum monographia 
BHL Pselaphiorum monographia cum synonymia extricataParis,1833 
BHL Species général des hydrocanthares et gyriniens; pour faire suite au species général des coléoptères de la collection de M. le Comte Dejean. Paris, Méquignon Père et Fils,1838.

French entomologists
1802 births
1869 deaths
Presidents of the Société entomologique de France
19th-century French zoologists
19th-century French physicians
Scientists from Paris